The Supsa is a river in the Black Sea basin of Georgia.

The Supsa corresponds to the ancient River Mogrus (or Nogrus), described by Pliny the Elder in his Naturalis Historia.

References

Rivers of Georgia (country)
Tributaries of the Black Sea